Emamzadeh railway station (Persian:ايستگاه راه آهن امامزاده, Istgah-e Rah Ahan-e Emamzadeh) is located in Varamin, Tehran Province. The station is owned by IRI Railway.

References

External links

Railway stations in Iran